Howard S. Cullman (September 23, 1891 – June 29, 1972) was an American civil servant, philanthropist, and board member of the Port Authority of New York and New Jersey for 42 years, serving as Chairman of the Board for ten years, from 1945 to 1955.

Biography
Howard Stix Cullman was born on September 23, 1891, to millionaire Joseph F. and Zillah Stix Cullman; his grandfather Ferdinand Cullman had been a millionaire in the tobacco business. Cullman graduated from Yale University in 1913.

He worked closely with Austin Tobin, and was considered Tobin's "right-hand man". In 1945, Cullman was elected as Chairman on 9–1 vote. From 1927 to 1969, Cullman was on the Board of the Port Authority. 

Cullman was Franklin Delano Roosevelt's treasurer for his New York campaigns.

In 1958, Dwight Eisenhower appointed Cullman Commissioner General, with the rank of Ambassador, for the Brussels World's fair.

See also
Austin Tobin
Eugenius Harvey Outerbridge
Christopher O. Ward

References 

1891 births
1972 deaths
Chairmen of the Port Authority of New York and New Jersey